Angela Hunter may refer to:

 Angela Hunter (cyclist) (born 1972), British cyclist
 Angela Hunter (Green Wing)